Archibald Bisset Smith VC (19 December 1878 – 10 March 1917) was a Scottish recipient of the Victoria Cross, the highest and most prestigious award for gallantry in the face of the enemy that can be awarded to British and Commonwealth forces.

Smith is one of only two members of the UK Merchant Navy to have been awarded the VC for his First World War service.

World War I action and Victoria Cross
Smith received this award for his action as Master of the New Zealand Shipping Company cargo ship . On 10 March 1917 in the Atlantic Ocean, Otaki, armed with one 4.7-inch gun, sighted the German merchant raider , which was armed with four 150 mm, one 105 mm and two 500 mm torpedo launches guns.

The raider ordered Otaki to stop but Captain Smith refused. A duel ensued, during which Otaki secured a number of hits and caused Möwe considerable damage, but Otaki sustained much damage and was on fire. Captain Smith therefore ordered his crew to abandon ship, but he himself stayed aboard and went down with his ship.

His citation reads:

As a Merchant officer, Smith could not receive the VC at that time. In 1919 he was posthumously commissioned as a temporary lieutenant in the Royal Naval Reserve, which entitled him to receive the VC posthumously.

As a British Merchant seafarer with no known grave, Smith is commemorated on the Tower Hill Memorial. On 10 March 2017 a memorial stone was laid at Schoolhill, Aberdeen, to commemorate the centenary of his action.

His VC is preserved at the P&O Heritage Collection in London.

Personal life
Smith was born at Cosie Brae in Cults on 19 December 1878, one of five children of William Smith, an accountant and wholesale merchant, and Annie Smith (née Nicol), both originally from Rhynie. William Smith was a descendant of Bold Peter Smith, a Jacobite killed at the Battle of Culloden.

Archibald was a student at Robert Gordon's College before joining the Merchant Navy in 1895. He gained his Master's ticket in 1903 while serving with the New Zealand Shipping Company, and served on the steamers Waikato, Rakaia, Waimate and Turakina.

Shortly before World War I, Smith married Edith Clulee (née Powell), whom he had met while working in Port Chalmers, New Zealand. She had a son, Alfred, from a previous marriage. Alfred later took his stepfather's surname.

Legacy
In November 1917 Smith was awarded a posthumous commendation. After the armistice of 11 November 1918 more details of the battle reached the UK authorities. Möwes captain, Nikolaus zu Dohna-Schlodien, described Otakis resistance as "a duel as gallant as naval history can relate". In May 1919 Smith was posthumously awarded the Victoria Cross.

King George V presented Smith's VC to Edith and Alfred at Buckingham Palace. After Edith's death in 1951, Alfred sold the VC and Archibald's other medals (the British War Medal, Victory Medal, and Mercantile Marine Medal) to the New Zealand Shipping Company for £ 125.

In 1937 his family presented the Otaki Shield to Robert Gordon's College, to be an annual award to the senior boy who is judged "pre‐eminent in character, in leadership and in athletics". The shield is accompanied by the prize of six weeks in New Zealand as Otaki Scholar, visiting various schools as a "roving ambassador" for the college.

References

Bibliography

External links

1878 births
1917 deaths
British World War I recipients of the Victoria Cross
Captains who went down with the ship
Civilians killed in World War I
Royal Navy recipients of the Victoria Cross
People from Aberdeenshire
British Merchant Navy officers
People educated at Robert Gordon's College
British Merchant Service personnel of World War I
People lost at sea
Royal Naval Reserve personnel